The Hochschule Bonn-Rhein-Sieg University of Applied Sciences is a German university of applied sciences with more than 9,500 students and 150 professors. Its campus comprises three
distinct locations, situated in Sankt Augustin, Rheinbach and Hennef / Sieg (all in the vicinity of Cologne and Bonn).

History

General Information
The Hochschule Bonn-Rhein-Sieg was founded on 1 January 1995 by the German Federal State of North Rhine-Westphalia. Its formal establishment was part of an agreement that compensated Bonn for its loss of status as capital of the Federal Republic of Germany. Until the end of 2004, the University of Applied Sciences was funded by the Federal Government of Germany. From 2005 it became an establishment of the German Federal State of North Rhine-Westphalia; since 1 January 2007 it has been an autonomous body of public law as defined by the German Higher Education Autonomy Act (Hochschulfreiheitsgesetz, HfG).The University of Applied Sciences was renamed into “Hochschule Bonn-Rhein-Sieg” on 1 January 2009, with the abbreviation being “H-BRS”. In October 2011, Hochschule Bonn-Rhein-Sieg joined the European University Association (EUA).

Locations
The University comprises three locations, including five departments. The Departments of Computer Science as well as Electrical Engineering, Mechanical Engineering and Technical Journalism (EMT)are located at Sankt Augustin, the Department of Natural Sciences can be found at Rheinbach and the Department of Management Sciences is located at both campuses. The Hennef site houses the Department of Social Security Studies. Bonn-Rhein-Sieg University's administrative buildings are located at the Sankt Augustin site. In Bonn the University of Applied Sciences runs the Bonn-Aachen International Center for Information Technology (B-IT) in collaboration with Aachen Technical University (Rheinisch-Westfälische Technische Hochschule) and the University of Bonn (Rheinische Friedrich-Wilhelms-Universität).

Departments and degree programmes
The degree programmes offered by H-BRS are recognised throughout the European Union within the framework of the European Credit Transfer System (ECTS), meaning that ECTS credits obtained at H-BRS can be recognised towards asimilar degree at any other European university. The university currently offers 36 degree programmes in five departments, divided into Bachelor's and Master's programmes. In addition, there are further education and certificate study programmes. The university has the following departments:

 The Department of Management Sciences
 The Department of Computer Science
 The Department of Electrical Engineering, Mechanical Engineering and Technical Journalism (EMT)
 The Department of Natural Sciences
 The Department of Social Security Studies

Central facilities and research institutes

Central facilities

The Language Centre 
The Language Centre works in close cooperation with all the departments, offering tailor-made courses to suit their individual requirements. At present the Language Centre offers general and subject-specific courses in 14 languages, which are, for the most part, held by native speakers. The range of courses is extended according to the students' individual requirements and needs. Furthermore, the Language Centre provides international students with the opportunity to sit internationally recognised language tests in English and German as a foreign language, such as the German Language Proficiency Test for the Admission of International Students to German Universities (DSH), which is mandatory for study at H-BRS. In addition to offering foreign-language courses and testing, the Language Centre conducts seminars in Intercultural Communication.

The University and District Library 
The buildings of the University and District Library, which also serves as district library for the Rhein-Sieg District, are located at Sankt Augustin and Rheinbach. The Library provides its customers with a versatile collection of books, periodicals, digital media and databases, which can in part be accessed from home. In addition, it offers regular art exhibitions, book readings and manifold information services as well as e-learning facilities. The Language Centre's Computer-Assisted Language Learning Laboratory (CALL) and a self-access centre are integrated into the Library.

Research institutes 
 The Centre for Entrepreneurship, Innovation and SMEs (CENTIM)
 The Centre for Ethics and Responsibility (ZEV)
 The Centre for Teaching Development and Innovation (ZIEL)
 The Graduate Institute (GI)
 The Institute for Detection Technologies (IDT)
 The Institute for Management (IfM)
 The Institute for Media Research and Development (IMEA)
 The Institute of Safety and Security Research (ISF)
 The Institute for Social Innovations (ISI)
 The Institute of Technology, Resource and Energy-Efficient Engineering (TREE)
 The Institute of Visual Computing (IVC)
 The International Centre for Sustainable Development (IZNE)

Student life

National Code of Conduct and international partnerships 
The Hochschule Bonn-Rhein-Sieg University of Applied Sciences has agreed to accept the "National Code of Conduct on Foreign Students at German Universities", passed by the German Rectors’ Conference in 2009. The Code of Conduct is aimed at strengthening internationalisation at German universities by securing and continuously enhancing the quality of support provided to international students. The guiding principle is, wherever possible, to grant international students the same rights as German or EU students enjoy and, over and above that, to offer them the services and assistance that they particularly need. The Code of Conduct is a voluntary commitment by the participating universities and contains fundamental standards relevant to the areas of information, marketing and admission as well as academic, language and social support.
International students coming to the Bonn-Rhein-Sieg University of Applied Sciences can rely upon compliance with the standards. This voluntary commitment demonstrates H-BRS' undertaking to provide appropriate support, which is an essential condition for the sustainable success of international students and researchers. Hochschule Bonn-Rhein-Sieg currently maintains partnerships with approximately 60 universities all over the world.

The Bonn Student Union (Studierendenwerk Bonn) 
The Bonn Student Union (Studierendenwerk Bonn) looks after the interests of all students in the surrounding region, including those enrolled at the Bonn-Rhein-Sieg University of Applied Sciences. It is responsible for H-BRS' food service, provides accommodation and helps with student finance as well as childcare. It is the students’ contact point for all matters relating to student welfare.

The student executive bodies and committees 
The interests of the Student Body, which comprises all the students enrolled at Bonn-Rhein-Sieg University, are represented by the following executive bodies and committees: the Student Parliament (StuPa), the General Students’ Committee (AStA), the student councils within each department as well as BRSU's central executive bodies, where the student representatives hold several seats. Every student at Bonn-Rhein-Sieg University can be elected into one of these institutions for a one-year term of office.  One of the boards of the AStA, dealing with cultural issues, initiates intercultural exchange projects. In addition, the student councils offer help and advice to international students.

The International Welcome Centre 
The International Welcome Centre is a meeting and service point aimed at providing support to all international students and guest academics before and during their study period at the Hochschule Bonn-Rhein-Sieg University of Applied Sciences. Here students can obtain all information relevant to the formalities required, to accommodation as well as life in Germany and on the campus.

The International Office 
The International Office organises regular excursions, boat trips and cultural events for international students. Through its proximity to the Rhine, the Siebengebirge mountains, the Eifel, the High Fens region and the Nürburgring, the Rhein-Sieg District provides excellent leisure opportunities. The nearby cities of Bonn, Aachen and Cologne, with their theatres, concert halls, museums, art galleries and cathedrals, offer a versatile programme of activities from the cultural point of view, too.

In collaboration with the Bonn-Rhein-Sieg Employment Agency (Agentur für Arbeit Bonn/Rhein-Sieg), the International Centre also runs a project aimed at supporting international students who wish to work in Germany when graduating from university.

Study Buddies 
The Study Buddy programme was initiated by the Department of Natural Sciences. Study Buddies are students in higher semesters who volunteer to look after students during the first weeks of their stay in Germany. This may involve contacting them via email, picking them up at the airport or the railway station, explaining the pitfalls of the German registration procedures, showing them around the University or simply sharing a coffee and chatting about the new experiences gained.

Out of Campus Day 
Once a year, the Department of Natural Sciences organises an intercultural festival called “Out of Campus Day” in collaboration with the General Students’ Committee (AStA) and the Student Parliament (StuPA). The festival is aimed at providing students with information on a study period abroad, at promoting communication between German and international students and at celebrating the international atmosphere at the Rheinbach Campus. Apart from providing students with comprehensive information on partner universities and exchange programmes, degrees, costs and funding possibilities, the Student Council organises a musical programme and a wide variety of games.

HELP – support for students and employees with family commitments 
HELP is a contact point aimed at giving support and advice to students and employees who have questions on how to balance their study/job and family commitments. HELP is responsible for collecting and communicating relevant information on childcare facilities and holiday childcare schemes to parents or members of BRSU with relatives in need of care. H-BRS also provides specially equipped study rooms to parents with young children. During their holidays, primary and secondary school children can be looked after within the framework of a project called "Try it".

The Bonn-Rhein-Sieg Runners and other sports activities 
Members and alumni of H-BRS have participated in the Bonn marathon organised by Deutsche Post on several occasions. This has now led to the formation of a sports team called “Bonn-Rhein-Sieg Runners”. Hochschule Bonn-Rhein-Sieg also has an online portal for students interested in sports. Additionally, the University of Bonn offers a sports programme that comes out at the beginning of each semester. It includes numerous activities in which students can take part using the facilities of the University of Bonn.

The Doppelpunkt university newspaper 
The doppelpunkt university newspaper is published twice a year. It covers a wide range of topics relating to H-BRS itself, tuition and research, university policy, international issues, the jobs market and miscellaneous items. Students are invited to make their own contributions to the newspaper. The Doppelpunkt also offers various online services, such as a virtual job fair and an online residential market.

Reputation, rankings and contests 
The Hochschule Bonn-Rhein-Sieg has been given excellent ratings and been presented with a number of achievement awards in many areas over the past few years.

The “Family-Friendly University” 
In March 2007 the Bonn-Rhein-Sieg University of Applied Sciences was awarded the basic certification as a “Family-Friendly University” for providing family-friendly facilities to students and employees alike - including childcare facilities, study rooms for parents with children, alternating telework and much else. In June 2010 the certification was extended for an additional three years.

The 2007 European E-Quality Seal 
On the occasion of the 2008 ERASMUS Conference of the German Academic Exchange Service (DAAD), the Hochschule Bonn-Rhein-Sieg University of Applied Sciences was awarded the 2007 European E-Quality Seal. H-BRS was the only university in the German Federal State of North Rhine-Westphalia to win this award in 2008. Along with the Hochschule Bonn-Rhein-Sieg, seven other universities throughout Germany were among the prize winners. The DAAD awards the E-Quality Seal for special merits and achievements relating to the exchange of German and international students and lecturers under the ERASMUS Scheme.

Internal innovation and teaching awards 
Since 2010, H-BRS has presented an internal innovation award aimed at honouring innovative ideas coming from within the University; at raising awareness of dedication to tuition, research and transfer and at giving new impetus to innovation in the Rhein-Sieg District. The focus of the award shifts from year to year.
In addition, the Hochschule Bonn-Rhein-Sieg grants an internal award for excellent performance in tuition every two years. The purpose of the award is to draw people's attention to high-quality teaching performance and to foster this; to give incentives to all teaching staff; to provide background information on tuition at universities, to raise awareness of the importance of tuition at H-BRS and to confer more responsibility on students.

Participation in international contests and organisation of international events

B-IT-bots contest 
The b-IT-bots team, which includes members of the University of Applied Sciences, regularly takes part in various RoboCup contests. Among others, it won the titles of German Champion (in 2009 and 2010) and World Champion (2009) in the RoboCup@Home contest. The team consists of professors from the Department of Computer Science, academic staff and students of the master's degree programme in Autonomous Systems.

Formula Student 
The student team BRS Motorsport regularly participates in “Formula Student”, a globally renowned construction and design contest for students. Teams from approximately 270 universities and universities of applied sciences all over the world develop one prototype each for a single-seated formula one racing car, as well as drawing up concepts for a fictitious production rate of 1,000 vehicles per year.

FrOSCon 
The two-day Free and Open Source Software Conference (FrOSCon) on issues relating to software and open source is held once a year by the association of the same name in collaboration with the local Linux/Unix User Group and the Department of Computer Science.

The Hochschule Bonn-Rhein-Sieg in digital media 
Hochschule Bonn-Rhein-Sieg is mentioned in the computer game “Deus Ex: Human Revolution”. In the last stage of the game the player can find an e-book containing information on a speech delivered by Hugh Darrows at the University of Applied Sciences in 2016. (The game refers to the year 2027). Hugh Darrows is the inventor of augmentation technology, which is subject to controversy according to the game.

BusinessCampus Rhein-Sieg GmbH 
To support students and graduates wishing to set up their own businesses, the Hochschule Bonn-Rhein-Sieg, the Rhein-Sieg District and Kreissparkasse Köln (Cologne savings bank) have jointly founded BusinessCampus Rhein-Sieg GmbH, i.e. the operating company of the business incubators at Sankt Augustin and Rheinbach. Here young entrepreneurs can rent offices at favourable prices, using the infrastructure and services provided. At each of the two locations in Sankt Augustin and Rheinbach, there is also a dining hall and a hall of residence.

Notable alumni 
 Katrin Bauerfeind (*1982), TV presenter
 Martin Kläser (*1987), poker player
 Julia Seeliger (*1979), journalist and politician
 Marco Knauf, Niclas Lecloux and Inga Koster, founders of the True Fruits business enterprise
 Witali Malykin (* 1982), Chess player

See also 
 List of German universities
 Wikipedia website in German

References

Links 
 Website of the Hochschule Bonn-Rhein-Sieg - English
 Website of the Hochschule Bonn-Rhein-Sieg - German
 Language Centre
 University and District Library
 Newspaper of the University - In German

Educational institutions established in 1995
Education in Bonn
Universities and colleges in North Rhine-Westphalia
1995 establishments in Germany